Gnetophyta is a division of plants (alternatively considered the subclass Gnetidae or order Gnetales), grouped within the gymnosperms (which also includes conifers, cycads, and ginkgos), that consists of some 70 species across the three relict genera: Gnetum (family Gnetaceae), Welwitschia (family Welwitschiaceae), and Ephedra (family Ephedraceae). Fossilized pollen attributed to a close relative of Ephedra has been dated as far back as the Early Cretaceous. Though diverse in the Early Cretaceous, only three families, each containing a single genus, are still alive today. The primary difference between gnetophytes and other gymnosperms is the presence of vessel elements, system of small tubes (Xylem) that transport water within the plant, similar to those found in flowering plants. Because of this, gnetophytes were once thought to be the closest gymnosperm relatives to flowering plants, but more recent molecular studies have brought this hypothesis into question.

Though it is clear they are all related, the exact evolutionary inter-relationships between gnetophytes are unclear. Some classifications hold that all three genera should be placed in a single order (Gnetales), while other classifications say they should be distributed among three separate orders, each containing a single family and genus. Most morphological and molecular studies confirm that the genera Gnetum and Welwitschia diverged from each other more recently than they did from Ephedra.

Ecology and morphology
Unlike most biological groupings, it is difficult to find many common characteristics between all of the members of the gnetophytes. The two common characteristics most commonly used are the presence of enveloping bracts around both the ovules and microsporangia as well as a micropylar projection of the outer membrane of the ovule that produces a pollination droplet, though these are highly specific compared to the similarities between most other plant divisions. L. M. Bowe refers to the gnetophyte genera as a "bizarre and enigmatic" trio because the gnetophytes' specialization to their respective environments is so complete that they hardly resemble each other at all. Gnetum species are mostly woody vines in tropical forests, though the best-known member of this group, Gnetum gnemon, is a tree native to western Malesia. The one remaining species of Welwitschia, Welwitschia mirabilis, native only to the dry deserts of Namibia and Angola, is a ground-hugging species with only two large strap-like leaves that grow continuously from the base throughout the plant's life. Ephedra species, known as "jointfirs" in the United States, have long slender branches which bear tiny scale-like leaves at their nodes. Infusions from these plants have been traditionally used as a stimulant, but ephedrine is a controlled substance today in many places because of the risk of harmful or even fatal overdosing.

Fossil Gnetophyta
Knowledge of gnetophyte history through fossil discovery has increased greatly since the 1980s. Gnetophyte fossils have been found that date from the Permian and the Triassic. Fossils dating back to the Jurassic have been found, though whether or not they belong to the gnetophytes is uncertain. Overall, the fossil record is richest in the early Cretaceous, with fossils of plants, seeds, and pollen have been found that can clearly be assigned to the gnetophytes.

Classification
With just three well-defined genera within an entire division, there still is understandable difficulty in establishing an unambiguous interrelationship among them; in earlier times matters were even more difficult and we find for example Pearson in the early 20th century speaking of the class Gnetales, rather than the order. G.H.M. Lawrence referred to them as an order, but remarked that the three families were distinct enough to deserve recognition as separate orders. Foster & Gifford accepted this principle, and placed the three orders together in a common class for convenience, which they called Gnetopsida. In general the evolutionary relationships among the seed plants still are unresolved, and the Gnetophyta have played an important role in the formation of phylogenetic hypotheses. Molecular phylogenies of extant gymnosperms have conflicted with morphological characters with regard to whether the gymnosperms as a whole (including gnetophytes) comprise a monophyletic group or a paraphyletic one that gave rise to angiosperms. At issue is whether the Gnetophyta are the sister group of angiosperms, or whether they are sister to, or nested within, other extant gymnosperms. Numerous fossil gymnosperm clades once existed that are morphologically at least as distinctive as the four living gymnosperm groups, such as Bennettitales, Caytonia and the glossopterids. When these gymnosperm fossils are considered, the question of gnetophyte relationships to other seed plants becomes even more complicated. Several hypotheses, illustrated below, have been presented to explain seed plant evolution. Morphological studies have supported a close relationship between Gnetophyta, Bennettitales and the Erdtmanithecales.

Recent research by Lee, Cibrian-Jaramillo, et al. (2011) suggests that the Gnetophyta are a sister group to the rest of the gymnosperms, contradicting the anthophyte hypothesis, which held that gnetophytes were sister to the flowering plants.

Gnetifer hypothesis
In the gnetifer hypothesis, the gnetophytes are sister to the conifers, and the gymnosperms are a monophyletic group, sister to the angiosperms.The gnetifer hypothesis first emerged formally in the mid-twentieth century, when vessel elements in the gnetophytes were interpreted as being derived from tracheids with circular bordered pits, as in conifers. It however only gained strong support with the emergence of molecular data in the late 1990s. Although the most salient morphological evidence still largely supports the anthophyte hypothesis, some more obscure morphological commonalities between the gnetophytes and conifers lend support to the gnetifer hypothesis.These shared traits include: tracheids with scalariform pits with tori interspersed with annular thickenings, absence of scalariform pitting in primary xylem, scale-like and strap-shaped leaves of Ephedra and Welwitschia; and reduced sporophylls.

Anthophyte hypothesis
From the early twentieth century, the anthophyte hypothesis was the prevailing explanation for seed plant evolution, based on shared morphological characters between the gnetophytes and angiosperms. In this hypothesis, the gnetophytes, along with the extinct order Bennettitales, are sister to the angiosperms, forming the "anthophytes". Some morphological characters that were suggested to unite the anthophytes include vessels in wood, net-veined leaves (in Gnetum only), lignin chemistry, the layering of cells in the apical meristem, pollen and megaspore features (including thin megaspore wall), short cambial initials, and lignin syringal groups. However, most genetic studies, as well as more recent morphological analyses, have rejected the anthophyte hypothesis.

Several of these studies have suggested that the gnetophytes and angiosperms have independently derived characters, including flower-like reproductive structures and tracheid vessel elements, that appear shared but are actually the result of parallel evolution.

Gnepine hypothesis
The gnepine hypothesis is a modification of the gnetifer hypothesis, and suggests that the gnetophytes belong within the conifers as a sister group to the Pinaceae. According to this hypothesis, the conifers as currently defined are not a monophyletic group, in contrast with molecular findings that support its monophyly. All existing evidence for this hypothesis comes from molecular studies since 1999. A 2018 phylogenomic study estimated the divergence between Gnetales and Pinaceae at around 241 millions of years ago, in the early Triassic while a 2021 study placed it earlier, in the Carboniferous.

However, the morphological evidence remains difficult to reconcile with the gnepine hypothesis. If the gnetophytes are nested within conifers, they must have lost several shared derived characters of the conifers (or these characters must have evolved in parallel in the other two conifer lineages): narrowly triangular leaves (gnetophytes have diverse leaf shapes), resin canals, a tiered proembryo, and flat woody ovuliferous cone scales. These kinds of major morphological changes are not without precedent in the Pinales, however: the Taxaceae, for example, have lost the classical cone of the conifers in favor of a single-terminal ovule, surrounded by a fleshy aril.

Gnetophyte-sister hypothesis
Some partitions of the genetic data suggest that the gnetophytes are sister to all of the other extant seed plant groups. However, there is no morphological evidence nor examples from the fossil record to support the gnetophyte-sister hypotheses.

Fossil lineages 
Ephedraceae
Leongathia V.A. Krassilov, D.L. Dilcher & J.G. Douglas 1998 Koonwarra fossil bed, Australia, Early Cretaceous (Aptian)
Jianchangia Yang, Wang and Ferguson, 2020 Jiufotang Formation, China, Early Cretaceous (Aptian)
Eamesia Yang, Lin and Ferguson, 2018 Yixian Formation, China, Early Cretaceous (Aptian)
Prognetella Krassilov et Bugdaeva, 1999 Yixian Formation, China, Early Cretaceous (Aptian) (initially interpreted as an angiosperm)
Chengia Yang, Lin & Wang, 2013, Yixian Formation, China, Early Cretaceous (Aptian)
Chaoyangia Duan, 1998  Yixian Formation, China, Early Cretaceous (Aptian)
Eragrosites Yixian Formation, China, Early Cretaceous (Aptian)
Gurvanella China, Mongolia, Early Cretaceous
Alloephedra China, Early Cretaceous
Amphiephedra China, Early Cretaceous
Beipiaoa China, Early Cretaceous
Ephedrispermum Portugal, Early Cretaceous (Aptian-Albian)
Ephedrites China, Early Cretaceous
Erenia China, Mongolia, Early Cretaceous
Liaoxia China, Early Cretaceous
Dichoephedra China, Early Cretaceous
Gnetaceae 
Khitania Guo et al. 2009 Yixian Formation, China, Early Cretaceous (Aptian)
Welwitschiaceae 
Priscowelwitschia Dilcher et al., 2005 Crato Formation, Brazil, Early Cretaceous (Aptian)
Cratonia Rydin et al., 2003 Crato Formation, Brazil, Early Cretaceous (Aptian)
Welwitschiostrobus Dilcher et al., 2005 Crato Formation, Brazil, Early Cretaceous (Aptian)
Incertae sedis: 
Drewria Crane & Upchurch, 1987 Potomac Group, USA, Albian (possible affinities to Welwitschiaceae)
Bicatia Friis, Pedersen and Crane, 2014 Figueira da Foz Formation, Portugal, Early Cretaceous (late Aptian early Albian), Potomac Group, USA, Albian (possible affinities to Welwitschiaceae)
Liaoningia Yang et al, 2017 Yixian Formation, China, Early Cretaceous (Aptian)
Protognetum Y. Yang, L. Xie et D.K. Ferguson, 2017 Daohugou, China, Middle Jurassic (Callovian)
Itajuba Ricardi-Branco et al, 2013, Crato Formation, Brazil, Early Cretaceous (Aptian)
Protoephedrites Rothwell et Stockey, 2013 Canada, Valanginian (possible ephedroid affinities) 
Siphonospermum Rydin et Friis, 2010 Yixian Formation, China, Early Cretaceous (Aptian)
Welwitschiophyllum Dilcher et al., 2005 Crato Formation, Brazil, Early Cretaceous (Aptian), Akrabou Formation, Morocco, Late Cretaceous (Cenomanian-Turonian) (Initially interpreted as a member of Welwitschiaceae, later considered uncertain).
Dayvaultia Manchester et al. 2021 Morrison Formation, USA, Late Jurassic (Tithonian)
Possible gnetophytes (not confirmed as members of the group)
Archaestrobilus Trujillo Formation, Texas, United States, Upper Triassic
Dechellyia-Masculostrobus Mongolia, Early Cretaceous (Aptian-Albian)
Dinophyton Chinle Formation, United States, Upper Triassic
Nataligma Molteno Formation, South Africa, Upper Triassic (Carnian)
Palaeognetaleana Wang, 2004, China, Upper Permian
Sanmiguelia United States, Late Triassic-Early Jurassic
Eoantha Russia, Early Cretaceous
Bassitheca Morrison Formation, USA, Late Jurassic (Tithonian)

References

Other Sources:

 
Plant divisions
Extant Permian first appearances